The Trinidad and Tobago women's national volleyball team is the national team of Trinidad and Tobago.

Results

FIVB Volleyball Women's World Championship
2018 — 23rd place  
2022 — Did Not Qualify

NORCECA Championship
2003 — 7th place
2005 — 8th place
2007 — 8th place
2009 — 8th place
2011 — 7th place
2013 — 6th place
2015 — 7th place
2019 — 8th place

Pan-American Cup
2007 — 12th place
2008 — 12th place
2009 — 10th place
2010 — 10th place
2011 — 10th place
2012 — 10th place
2013 — 10th place
2014 — 11th place
2015 — Did not enter
2016 — 10th place
2017 — 9th place
2018 — 11th place
2019 — 10th place

FIVB World Grand Prix
 2017 — 31st

Current squad
The following is the Trinidadian and Tobagonian roster in the 2018 World Championship.

Head coach: Francisco Cruz Jiménez

See also
Trinidad and Tobago men's national volleyball team

References

NORCECA

National women's volleyball teams
Volleyball
Volleyball in Trinidad and Tobago